"Crash" is a song by English indie pop band the Primitives, written by band members Paul Court, Steve Dullaghan, and Tracy Cattell. The song was first recorded for the band's 1988 debut album, Lovely. "Crash" was released as a single in February 1988, peaking at number five on UK Singles Chart, number three on the US Modern Rock Tracks chart, and number two on the Swedish Singles Chart.

In 1994, the song was featured on the Dumb & Dumber movie soundtrack as "Crash (The '95 Mix)". This remix included additional guitars, percussion, organ, and backing vocals—none of which were performed by any of the Primitives. Several cover versions are based on the '95 Mix rather than the original.

Track listings
UK 7-inch single
A. "Crash"
B. "I'll Stick with You"

UK 10-inch single
A1. "Crash" – 2:32
B1. "I'll Stick with You" – 1:58
B2. "Crash" (live in studio) – 2:06

UK 12-inch single
A1. "Crash" – 2:32
A2. "I'll Stick with You" – 2:34
B1. "Crash" (demo recorded October 1985) – 2:19
B2. "Things Get in Your Way" – 2:21

Charts

Weekly charts

Year-end charts

Cover versions

Chloë version

"Crash" was covered by Australian singer-songwriter Chloë for her album Beyond Coming, and released as her second single on 5 September 2005. It peaked at No. 10 on the Australian Singles Chart.

The music video was directed by Mark Barold, and filmed at a Sushi Train restaurant. It depicts Chloë as a customer. Instead of sushi going around the conveyor belt there are objects like a drummer, some dancers, a fish and a pair of sumo wrestlers.

Track listing
 "Crash" – 3:16
 "Crash" (Crackle N' Pop remix) – 7:03
 "Stars" (Sterling remix) – 3:39

Charts

Matt Willis version

"Crash" was also covered by British singer-songwriter Matt Willis and released as a single on 16 April 2007. Willis rerecorded the song specially for the 2007 film Mr. Bean's Holiday, for which Rowan Atkinson appeared as his character in the music video along with Willis.

Track listing

Charts

Other artists
 PLASTICZOOMS featuring Alina Rin
 Belle & Sebastian covered the song for their 2012 album Late Night Tales: Belle & Sebastian Vol. II

References

1988 songs
1988 singles
2005 singles
2007 singles
The Primitives songs
Chloë (Australian singer) songs
Matt Willis songs
Mr. Bean
RCA Records singles
Sony BMG singles
Mercury Records singles
British power pop songs